Geisenbrunn station is a railway station in the municipality of Geisenbrunn, located in the Starnberg district in Upper Bavaria, Germany.

History
The station is located to the north of the Gilching district of Geisenbrunn. The unoccupied Haltepunkt initially only had a bulk platform and a milk loading ramp on the track. In 1910, the Bayerische Staatseisenbahnen (Bavarian State Railways) set up a rail siding secured by a covering agency to form a clay works, which was dismantled before 1938. Due to the increasing number of passengers, the municipality of Argelsried erected a single-storey wooden hipped roof building around 1920 with a service room and a waiting room in which a railway agent was stationed to sell tickets. In 1962, Deutsche Bundesbahn stopped selling tickets again and the station was no longer occupied. With the double-track extension of the line, Deutsche Bundesbahn put two new side platforms into operation at Geisenbrunn in 1986.

References

External links

Munich S-Bahn stations
Railway stations in Bavaria
Buildings and structures in Starnberg (district)
Railway stations in Germany opened in 1903